Gasota is a village located in the north Indian state of Himachal Pradesh, in the Hamirpur district. It is known for its ancient temple dedicated to the Hindu deity Shiva. other prominent villages nearby are 
Lambloo, Baroha and Kohli. According to a 2011 census, there are 541 residents.

References

Villages in Hamirpur district, Himachal Pradesh